The Black Cat is a nightclub in Washington, D.C., located on 14th Street Northwest in the Shaw/U Street neighborhood. The club was founded in 1993 by former Gray Matter drummer Dante Ferrando, along with a group of investors (including D.C. area native and Nirvana drummer and future Foo Fighters leader Dave Grohl) and quickly established itself as a venue for independent music. While the Black Cat is most known for its support of indie rock, featured musical acts include metal, punk, and electronic, as well as DJ/dance nights.

The Black Cat's "Mainstage" is on the second floor and has a capacity of approximately 700. Lesser known acts play on the "Backstage", a smaller area on the first floor that holds approximately 200 people. The first floor of the club also contains a no-cover bar/lounge called the "Red Room", and the "Food For Thought" café. Serving primarily vegetarian food, along with some meat and vegan dishes, "Food For Thought" is named for the Dupont Circle vegetarian restaurant – owned by Ferrando's father Bob Ferrando – that operated from 1973 to 1999.

It was announced in September 2018 that, by the end of the year, the venue would shrink in half and that the "Backstage" and "Red Room" would close, moving into a much smaller space upstairs in the venue due to declining interest from patrons of the venue and Ferrando saying that they are making room for one or two retail tenants that fit in better with the new landscape of the neighborhood.

In 2001, the venue moved three doors south, from 1831 to 1811 14th Street.

The building that the Black Cat now operates in used to be a dance club called The Cage, and before that, Mattos Paints.

The Black Cat is served by the U Street station on the Washington Metro, about three blocks from the stop.

The venue has hosted many successful musical artists, the likes of which include Jeff Buckley, Bikini Kill, Death Cab for Cutie, The Cramps, The Killers, The Strokes, Elliott Smith, Molchat Doma and the Yeah Yeah Yeahs.

References

External links

 Official site

Black Cat
Music venues in Washington, D.C.
1993 establishments in Washington, D.C.
Event venues established in 1993